Rosa Muki Bonaparte (died December 8, 1975) was a Timorese politician and independence and women's rights activist. She was a member of FRETILIN National Committee in the mid 1970s.
On 28 November 1975 she gave birth to the East Timor Popular Women's Organization (East Timorese Women's Movement) when she "unfurled the new red, black and yellow flag with a white star." Her presidency was short-lived as just days later on 7 December 1975, Bonaparte was captured and executed by an Indonesian firing squad.

Rotunda Rosa Muki Bonaparte - A monument inside a roundabout in Mandarin - Dili was named after Rosa Bonaparte in remembrance of her contribution to the Independence movement of Timor-Leste.

References

Fretilin politicians
East Timorese women in politics
1975 deaths
Year of birth missing